"Papi chulo... (te traigo el mmmm...)" is a 2003 song recorded by Panamanian rapper Lorna. Released as her debut single in the summer of 2003, the song achieved huge success in many countries, becoming a top five hit in France, the Netherlands, Belgium and Italy.

Song information
Sponsored by NRJ, the song also features as a B-side on Lorna's second single, "Papito ven a mí". In the refrains, the singer can be heard sighing in a sexual manner.

In the music video itself, Lorna performs a suggestive dance while singing.

In France, the single went to number 46 on July 20, 2003. It climbed quickly and reached the top 10 three weeks later, finally topping the chart for one week. It managed a total of 20 weeks on the chart altogether, 14 of which were in the top 10. It fell off the chart after dropping to number 25, probably because the song was available on the singer's next single which had by then been released. As of August 2014, it was the 59th best-selling single of the 21st century in France, with 364,000 units sold.

In Italy, the song title and the song itself have been widely used in political satire; "papi" (daddy) is one of the nicknames of Silvio Berlusconi, first used by Noemi Letizia, a girl involved in one of the many sexual scandals of the Italian Prime Minister. "Chulo", as well as meaning "pimp" in Spanish, sounds like "ciùlo", an Italian dialect (Milanese) term for the sexual act.

The song was also a hit in Pakistan where it was featured in numerous Punjabi stage dramas. Pakistani artist Younis Jani made his own version of the song which was also a hit in Pakistan.

Track listings
 CD single
 "Papi Chulo... te traigo el mmmm" (radio edit) — 2:58
 "Papi Chulo... te traigo el mmmm" (original version) — 2:56

 CD maxi
 "Papi Chulo... te traigo el mmmm" (radio edit) — 3:00
 "Papi Chulo... te traigo el mmmm" (extended edit) — 5:45
 "Papi Chulo... te traigo el mmmm" (original version) — 3:00

 12" maxi
 "Papi Chulo... te traigo el mmmm"
 "Papi Chulo... te traigo el mmmm" (jiggy's Latin-afro remix)
 "Papi Chulo... te traigo el mmmm" (original mix)

Credits
 Licensed from Metropol Records
 Produced by Rodney S.Clark Donalds
 Published by Metropol Music
 Sub-published in France by Scorpio Music (Black Scorpio) Sacem
 P&C 2003 Metropol Records

Charts and sales

Weekly charts

Year-end charts

Certifications

References

2003 debut singles
Lorna (rapper) songs
SNEP Top Singles number-one singles
Spanish-language songs
2003 songs